Fogging, also known as blurring, is used for censorship or privacy. A visual area of a picture or movie is blurred to obscure it from sight. This form of censorship is used for sexually related images/scenes, hiding genitals, pubic hair, or sexual penetration of any sort. Pixelization is a form of fogging. In Japan, where it is called bokashi, fogging is employed on most films aired on public television that feature adult content of any kind.

This form of editing also appears in television programs where an individual's face may not be shown due to legal or privacy concerns. As it does not contrast with the surrounding image very much, it is arguably preferable over most other forms of censorship.  However, unlike other forms of visual censoring, it does not allow the preservation of any information about the original stimulus. Fogging is also used if a scene is too bloody and gruesome to be rendered even in black and white, as well as on vehicle license plates (to protect the identity of a vehicle's owner), and over branded items and specific company names.

References 

 

Censorship
Self-censorship